Rosa woodsii is a species of wild rose known by the common names Woods' rose, interior rose, common wild rose, mountain rose, pear-hip rose, and prairie rose.

Distribution and habitat
It is native to North America including much of Canada and Alaska and the western and central United States. It grows in a variety of habitats such as open woods, plains, stream banks, stony slopes and disturbed areas.

Description

Growth pattern
Rosa woodsii is a perennial bushy shrub which grows up to three meters tall. The shrubs can form large, dense thickets. The plant reproduces sexually by seed and vegetatively by sprouting from the root crown, layering, and by producing root suckers.

Leaves and stems
The stems are straight, red to grey-brown and studded with prickles. The deciduous leaves are each made up of several widely spaced sharp-toothed leaflets up to 5 centimeters long.

Inflorescence and fruit
The inflorescence is a cyme of up to a few fragrant flowers with five petals in any shade of pink and measuring up to 2.5 centimeters in length. Flowers bloom between May to July and have many stamens and pistils. The fruit is a red rose hip which may be over a centimeter long and matures in August to September. They can be eaten, used in tea or as medicine.

Cultural impact
The flower was featured as one of four different wildflowers on postage stamps issued by the United States in 2022.

References

External links
 Jepson Manual treatment - Rosa woodsii
Washington Burke Museum
Southwest Colorado Wildflowers

woodsii
Bird food plants
Flora of North America